Sir Gerard Foliott Vaughan (11 June 1923 – 29 July 2003) was a British psychiatrist and politician, who reached ministerial rank during the Thatcher administration. He was perhaps most famous for losing a battle of wills with the Campaign for Nuclear Disarmament's Joan Ruddock over the government's grant to the Citizens Advice Bureau, a battle that cost him his government post and permanently curtailed his political ambitions.

Early life
Gerard Vaughan was the son of a sugar planter, born and educated in what is now Mozambique. During the Second World War, his father joined the Royal Air Force as a pilot, and was killed.

Medical career
The young Vaughan studied medicine in London, attending the University of London, Guy's Hospital, and the Maudsley Hospital. He eventually became the consultant in charge of the Bloomfield Clinic at Guy's Hospital, serving in that role from 1958 to 1979.

Politics
Vaughan became involved in Conservative Party politics in the mid-1950s, serving as an alderman on the then London County Council. He stood for the constituency of Poplar in East London in the general election of 1955 but was defeated. In the general election of 1970, he won the Reading constituency from Labour. Thereafter, he represented the constituencies of Reading South and Reading East until his retirement from politics before the general election of 1997.

During the government of Edward Heath, Vaughan served as a government whip and as Parliamentary Private Secretary to Francis Pym, the Secretary of State for Northern Ireland. When Margaret Thatcher became leader of the Conservative Party, after Heath's defeat in the general elections of February 1974 and October 1974, Vaughan became her health spokesman. He became a minister in the Department of Health and Social Security under Patrick Jenkin after the Conservative Party won the general election in 1979.

Vaughan did not get on with his new boss, Norman Fowler, who replaced Jenkin in 1981. In 1982, Vaughan was transferred to become consumer affairs minister. When he discovered that the then chair of the Campaign for Nuclear Disarmament, Joan Ruddock, was also head of his local Citizen's Advice Bureau (CAB), he threatened to halve the government's contribution to CABs across the country. The uproar that followed, both from the thousands of voluntary workers in the CAB and from their Conservative MPs, forced Vaughan to retreat during an angry Commons debate in April 1983.

Vaughan was dropped from the government in 1983 and given a knighthood in 1984. From the back benches, he served on the Education Select Committee from 1983 to 1993, and the Science and Technology Select Committee from 1993 to 1997. In his Reading constituency, he fought against plans, sponsored by Nicholas Ridley, to build housing in Berkshire's diminishing green belt. Vaughan was a freemason.

References

Sources

1923 births
2003 deaths
Knights Bachelor
Members of the Parliament of the United Kingdom for Reading
Conservative Party (UK) MPs for English constituencies
Members of London County Council
Politicians awarded knighthoods
Freemasons of the United Grand Lodge of England
Alumni of King's College London
UK MPs 1970–1974
UK MPs 1974
UK MPs 1974–1979
UK MPs 1979–1983
UK MPs 1983–1987
UK MPs 1987–1992
UK MPs 1992–1997
British expatriates in Mozambique